The National Health Service Reorganisation Act 1973 is an Act of the Parliament of the United Kingdom.

The purpose of the Act was to reorganise the National Health Service. This was the first time the service had been reorganised since it was established in 1948.

The Act also established the posts of Health Service Commissioner for England and Wales.  Separate legislation was passed establishing the post in Scotland.  The provisions of the Act relating to the Health Service Commissioners have largely been replaced by the Health Service Commissioners Act 1993.

The National Health Service had been excluded from the remit of the Parliamentary Commissioner for Administration when the Parliamentary Commissioner Act 1967 became law.

The impetus for the establishment of a Health Ombudsman arose from growing dissatisfaction with the quality of service in the NHS through the 1960s.  This was encapsulated by scandals about the care provided to the elderly and mentally ill at Ely Hospital in Cardiff, Farleigh Hospital in Bristol and Whittingham Hospital near Preston.  Hospitals were free to determine their own complaints procedures for the investigation of complaints, subject only to guidance by the Ministry of Health.  The Davies Report, published in 1973, criticised the complaints system then in place.  The Government announced in 1972 that it intended to establish a Health Service Ombudsman and that this was to be at the apex of the NHS complaints system.

Provisions establishing the posts were not extensively discussed in debate in the House of Commons, indicating the consensus around their establishment. The Act was introduced by a Conservative administration which had been in power since 1970. The Labour party returned to power in 1974 and implemented the planned reorganization of the health service.

References 

United Kingdom Acts of Parliament 1973
NHS legislation